Ready To Rock may refer to:

Ready to Rock
"Ready To Rock", a song by Krokus from The Blitz
"Ready To Rock", a song by Airbourne from Ready to Rock